Pačlavice is a municipality and village in Kroměříž District in the Zlín Region of the Czech Republic. It has about 900 inhabitants.

Administrative parts
Villages of Lhota and Pornice are administrative parts of Pačlavice.

Notable people
Mathias Franz Graf von Chorinsky Freiherr von Ledske (1720–1786), Bishop of Brno

References

Villages in Kroměříž District